Raj Chakraborty (born 21 February 1975) is an Indian film director, actor, producer and politician. He is one of the most commercially successful film-makers in Tollywood. Before directing his debut film, he was busy in Bengali TV. Raj Chakraborty was associated with Zee Bangla's popular laughter show Mirakkel, hosted by Mir, and dance competition Dance Bangla Dance, judged by Mithun Chakraborty, during their initial days. He also directed Star Jalsha's laughter programme I Laugh You. He has been a Member of Legislative Assembly of West Bengal from Barrackpore since 2021.

Filmography

As director

As actor

As producer

Accolades

Television 
Raj Chakraborty produced the television serial Kanamachi, which was aired on Star Jalsha. For Zee Bangla, Raj Chakraborty Productions made the popular soap opera Raage Anuraage. He returned as director of his very own show I Laugh You, a show he had started in its first season. I Laugh You was a very popular laughter programme in the Indian regional television world, which was aired on Star Jalsha. Raj Chakraborty's association with another very popular Bengali entertainment channel Colors Bangla occurred with him producing the soap opera Kajallata for that channel.

As producer in television

Series 
Proloy Asche (Directed for Sananda TV produced by ABP)
Nayika (Directed for Sananda TV produced by ABP)
Josh (On Sananda TV produced by ABP)
Kanamachi (On Star Jalsha) 
Raage Anuraage (On Zee Bangla) 
Kajallata (On Colors Bangla) 
Bedini Moluar Kotha
 Falna (On Star Jalsha)
Sangeet er Mahajuddha (On Colors Bangla) (Also Director)
Godhuli Alap (On Star Jalsha)

Telefilms As Producer 
Dev I Love You
Nimki Phulki
Guti Mallar
Dum Dum Digha Digha(Sequel of Guti Mallar)
Guti Mallarer Athithi(Sequel of Guti Mallar and Dum Dum Digha Digha)
Nimki Phulki 2(Sequel of Nimki Phulki)-produced and directed by Abhimanyu Mukherjee

Political career 
He has recently joined in Trinamool Congress in the hands of leader Mamata Banerjee. Later on 5 March 2021, Trinamool Congress leaders announced Chakraborty to be contesting this 2021 West Bengal Legislative Assembly Elections from Barrackpore (Vidhan Sabha constituency). He won on 2 May 2021.

References

External links

Upperstall.com

1975 births
Living people
Film directors from West Bengal
Bengali film directors
People from North 24 Parganas district
21st-century Indian film directors
West Bengal MLAs 2021–2026